Omsukchan Airport  is a minor airport built 7 km south of Omsukchan in Magadan Oblast, Russia

Airlines and Destinations

Statistics

References

Airports in Magadan Oblast